Rathod is a surname of Indian origin.

People with this surname include:

 Amol Rathod, Indian cinematographer
 Anil Rathod, Indian politician
 Bhakti Rathod, Indian actress
 Bhavsinh Rathod, Indian politician
 Darshan Rathod, Indian film score composer
 Dipsinh Shankarsinh Rathod, Indian politician
 Govind Mukkaji Rathod, Indian politician
 Hansmukh Rathod, Indian astrologer
 Hardik Rathod, Indian cricketer
 Harising Nasaru Rathod, Indian politician
 Kalu Rathod, Indian politician
 Kama Rathod, Indian politician
 Kanjibhai Rathod, Indian film director
 Kiran Rathod, Indian actress
 Nick Rathod, American non-profit administrator
 Nikhil Rathod, Indian cricketer
 Pranali Rathod, Indian actress
 Ramesh Rathod, Indian politician
 Rathod Bapu Rao, Indian politician
 Reewa Rathod, Indian singer and songwriter
 Roop Kumar Rathod, Indian singer and musician
 Samira Rathod, Indian architect
 Sanjay Rathod, Indian politician
 Sanjeev Rathod, Indian film score composer
 Satyavathi Rathod, Indian politician
 Shahabuddin Rathod, Indian scholar
 Shardul Rathod, Indian film writer
 Sunali Rathod, Indian singer
 Uttam Rathod, Indian politician
 Vinod Rathod, Indian singer

See also 
 Rathore
 Rathore (surname)

Surnames of Indian origin